Richard Gibbs (born 1955) is an American film composer and music producer.

Richard Gibbs may also refer to:
 Richard Gibbs, 2nd Baron Wraxall (1928–2001), British peer
 Richard Gibbs (judge) (born 1941), British judge
 Richard Gibbs (diplomat), United States Ambassador to Peru, 1875–1879, and to Bolivia, 1883–1885
 Richard Gibbs (biologist), Australian geneticist
 Richard Gibbs (Canadian football) (born c. 1945), Canadian and American football player
 Dick Gibbs (1892–1916), Australian rules footballer
 Dick Gibbs (basketball) (born 1948), American basketball player